Gier may refer to:
 Gier (river), a river in France
 Aqueduct of the Gier, an ancient Roman aqueduct
 GIER, a 1961 computer made by Regnecentralen

People with the surname
 Jack de Gier (born 1968), Dutch retired football striker
 Kerstin Gier (born 1966), German author
 Markus Gier (born 1970), Swiss competition rower and Olympic champion
 Michael Gier (born 1967), Swiss competition rower and Olympic champion
 Rob Gier (born 1981), English–Filipino footballer

Surnames from nicknames